Shivprasad Chanpuria was an Indian politician who was the member of Rajya Sabha from Madhya Pradesh from 10 April 1990 to 9 April 1996.

Personal life 
He was born in 1 March 1917 in the Jabalpur district, his parents were Chhote Lal Chanpuria and Kapoor Bai. He educated in a government high school in Damoh district and married Tarabai in June 1938.

References 

Rajya Sabha members from Madhya Pradesh
People from Madhya Pradesh
Madhya Pradesh politicians
Bharatiya Janata Party politicians from Madhya Pradesh